The United Grain Growers, or UGG, was a Canadian grain farmers' cooperative for grain storage and distribution that operated between 1917 and 2001.

History

In 1917, the Grain Growers' Grain Company (GGGC) merged with the Alberta Farmers' Co-operative Elevator Company, founded in 1913, to form the United Grain Growers (UGG), which provided grain marketing, handling and supply.
UGG was active in grain sales, crop inputs and livestock production services.

In 2001, UGG merged with Agricore to form Agricore United in a deal brokered by Archer Daniels Midland, a majority stakeholder in the new company.

Gallery & locations

Alberta

British Columbia

Manitoba

Saskatchewan

See also
 Francis Black
 James Galbraith
 John Edward Brownlee
 Wallace v. United Grain Growers Ltd.

References

Sources

External links
 UGG Administrative History

Agricultural cooperatives in Canada
Economy of Manitoba
Agricultural marketing cooperatives
Former cooperatives of Canada
Food and drink companies established in 1917
Food and drink companies disestablished in 2001
Grain companies
1917 establishments in Manitoba
2001 disestablishments in Manitoba
Defunct companies based in Winnipeg